An anti-ship ballistic missile (ASBM) is a military ballistic missile system designed to hit a warship at sea.

Due to the often hypersonic flight speed of ballistic missiles an ASBM's kinetic energy alone may be sufficient to cripple or outright destroy a supercarrier with a single conventional warhead impact.  Unlike a nuclear warhead, however, this would require a direct hit to be effective; therefore unlike a typical ballistic missile, which follows a ballistic flight path after the relatively brief initial phase of powered flight, an ASBM would require a precise and high-performance terminal guidance system with advanced sensors and in-flight calibrations in order successfully to hit a moving target.

Soviet Union

The 4K18 was a Soviet Union intermediate-range ballistic anti-ship missile (also known as R-27K, where "K" stands for Korabelnaya which means "ship-related") NATO SS-NX-13. Initial submarine testing began on 9 December 1972 on board the K-102, a Golf-class submarine. Test firings were carried out between 11 September and 4 December 1973. Following the initial trials, the K-102 continued making trial launches with both the R-27 and the R-27K, until it was accepted for service on 15 August 1975.

Using external targeting data, the R-27K/SS-NX-13 would have been launched underwater to a range of between 350-400 nm (650–740 km), covering a "footprint" of 27 nm (50 km). The Maneuvering Re-Entry vehicle (MaRV) would then home in on the target with a CEP of 400 yards (370 m). Warhead yield was between 0.5-1 Mt.

The R-27K / SS-NX-13 was the world's first Anti Ship Ballistic Missile. However it never became operational, since every launch tube used for the R-27K counted as a strategic missile in the SALT agreement, and they were considered more important.

Russia

China

China has inducted the world's first  operational anti-ship ballistic missile, a "carrier killer" capable of carrying both conventional and nuclear warheads, known as the DF-21D. In 2010, it was reported that China had entered the DF-21D into its early operational stage for deployment.

China is apparently working on a second-generation ASBM using hypersonic maneuverable reentry vehicle technology tested on the DF-ZF.  This would allow the warhead to search for the current location of the carrier, instead of just dropping towards the predicted spot it was initially aiming at.  The high speed maneuvers would also make the missile much harder to intercept.

India

Indian navy currently has ship launched Dhanush ballistic missile in use for anti-ship roles. It has a range of  capable of anti-ship operations. Another missile Agni-P, a technology spin off variant of Agni-IV and Agni-V has been speculated to be capable of undertaking ASBM roles or predecessor of a carrier-killer missile currently under development.

Till September 2022, DRDO had completed design work of another  land-based  range missile to attack targets across Line of Actual Control with an anti ship variant against aircraft carriers to cover Indian carriers in Bay of Bengal and Arabian Sea.

Iran

In February 2011, Iran demonstrated a short-range anti-ship ballistic missile named Persian Gulf or Khalij Fars, a missile based on the Fateh-110 which successfully hit a stationary target vessel. It has been reported as a short ranged ballistic missile with a range of 250–300 km. Later, Iran introduced the Hormuz missile with anti-ship capability. In 2020, Iran unveiled the Zulfiqar Basir, an anti-ship variant of the Zulfiqar with a range of 700km. Iran also reports successful test of the Emad missile to target aircraft carriers at a range of more than 1,000km .

Ukraine

On 24 March 2022, during Russo-Ukrainian War, it was reported that a Tochka missile hit an Alligator-class landing ship in the Port of Berdiansk. Two other landing ships were also damaged in the strike and one could be seen leaving the port slowly.

Countermeasures

The United States Navy fields what some experts think to be the best, on paper; midcourse anti-ballistic defense in the world, and is developing high powered lasers for terminal-defense against anti-ship ballistic missiles.
The U.S. arsenal has a variety of potential countermeasures.
According to a senior political scientist at the RAND Corporation, Roger Cliff, an anti-ship ballistic missile is not useful without additional complex ship detection, data processing and communication systems, all of which, including the missile itself, could be jammed or spoofed, though the USN has never demonstrated such an ability.

See also
 Anti-ship missile
 Cruise missile
 Surface-to-surface missile
 Anti-ballistic missile
 Anti-ballistic missile treaty
 Atmospheric reentry
 Prompt Global Strike

References

External links
Executive overview: Jane's Strategic Weapon Systems, July 2008
An introduction to ballistic missiles
Aviation Week
China’s Evolving Conventional Strategic Strike Capability: The Anti-Ship Ballistic Missile Challenge to U.S. Maritime Operations in the Western Pacific and Beyond, Project 2049 Institute, September 2009
 Using The Land To Control The Sea?: Chinese Analysts Consider the Anti-ship Ballistic Missile, Naval War College, September 2009

Missile types
Naval warfare